The Peugeot Type 54 was an all-new model made in 1903.  Producing 250 units in less than a year, it was Peugeot's first considerable production effort.  Front-engine design with rear-wheel drive, made possible by adriveshaft, was in its second year of use at Peugeot. The National Museum of New Zealand; Te Papa, has a "Type 54" on static display.

With a new 652 cc engine,  was available.

References
Production figures
Company history page on Type 54
 Te Papa Museum

Type 54
Cars introduced in 1903
1900s cars
Veteran vehicles